Patapsco Vallis is a valley in the Elysium quadrangle of Mars, located at 24° N and 207° West.  It is 153 km long and was named after a modern river in Maryland, United States.

References

Valleys and canyons on Mars
Elysium quadrangle